Ravenswood High School could refer to:
Ravenswood High School (West Virginia)
The former Ravenswood High School (East Palo Alto), operated 1958-1976
 Ravenswood School for Girls in Gordon, New South Wales, Australia

See also
Ravenwood High School, Brentwood, Tennessee